Thaaliya Salangaiya is an 1977 Indian Tamil-language drama film directed by T. R. Ramanna. The film stars Vanisri and Muthuraman. It is a remake of the Kannada film Gejje Pooje. The film was released on 13 April 1977.

Plot

Cast
Vanisri
Muthuraman
V. K. Ramasamy
Sachu
Major Sundarrajan
Pandari Bai
S. V. Subbaiah
S. A. Ashokan

Production
Thaaliya Salangaiya, a remake of Kannada film Gejje Pooje, was directed by T. R. Ramanna and produced by M. Sivaprakasam under Sarojini Movies. The screenplay was written by Vietnam Veedu Sundaram. Cinematography was handled by M. A. Rahman and editing by T. A. Thangaraj. Television actress Srilekha made her acting debut with this film portraying Muthuraman's sister.

Soundtrack
Soundtrack was composed by K. V. Mahadevan and lyrics by Kannadasan.

Release and reception
Thaaliya Salangaiya was released on 13 April 1977. Kanthan of Kalki praised the acting performance of Vanisri and other actors and concluded Ramanna has directed the film well.

References

External links

1970s Tamil-language films
1977 drama films
Films directed by T. R. Ramanna
Films scored by K. V. Mahadevan
Indian drama films
Tamil remakes of Kannada films